Tribe Cool Crew is a 2014 anime television series produced by Sunrise (later by its subsidiary, BN Pictures). The series follows the energetic Haneru and the shy Kanon as they join three others, Kumo, Mizuki, and Yuzuru, to form the street dance troupe Tribe Cool Crew. The series aired on TV Asahi in Japan between September 28, 2014 and October 4, 2015 and was simulcast by Crunchyroll. The series is directed by Masaya Fujimori and written by Atsuhiro Tomioka, with character design by Yoshiaki Yanagida and music production by avex proworks and a-bee. The opening theme is "Heartbeat" performed by Lol. The series is licensed in North America by Sentai Filmworks.

Episode list

References

Tribe Cool Crew